HD 142415 b is an exoplanet with the semi-amplitude of 51.3 ± 2.3 m/s. This indicates the minimum mass of 1.69 Jupiter mass, an orbital period of 386.3 days, and the semi-major axis of 1.07 astronomical units based from its stellar mass. The wild, oval pathed wobble of the star used by Doppler spectrometer indicates that the orbit of the planet is highly eccentric at around 50%.

The planet was discovered in La Silla Observatory on 30 June 2003 by Mayor, who used the CORALIE spectrograph.

See also 
 HD 10647 b
 HD 111232 b
 HD 141937 b
 HD 142022 Ab
 HD 169830 c
 HD 216770 b
 HD 41004 Ab
 HD 65216 b

References

External links 
 

Exoplanets discovered in 2003
Giant planets
Norma (constellation)
Exoplanets detected by radial velocity